Tom Wessels (born 1951) is an American terrestrial ecologist working as a professor at Antioch University New England in the Department of Environmental Studies, where he founded a master's program in conservation biology. He is the author of five books and is an active environmentalist.

Education
Wessels earned a Bachelor of Science degree in wildlife biology from the University of New Hampshire and a Master of Arts in ecology at the University of Colorado.

Career 
Wessels went directly into academia, beginning with a post at the now-defunct Windham College in Putney, Vermont. In 1978, he became an adjunct faculty member at Antioch University New England and was instrumental in developing numerous courses in Environmental Studies Department. He became a tenured faculty member at Antioch in 2000.

In addition to teaching at Antioch, Wessels has traveled on expedition to Iceland with Haraldur Sigurdsson. He chaired the Science department for ten years at The Putney School, a boarding high school in Putney, Vermont. He served as  the chair of the Robert and Patricia Switzer Foundation, a foundation that provides grants and fellowships to promote environmental leadership. Since 1995 he has served as an ecological consultant for the Rainforest Alliance SmartWood Program in the Northeastern United States.

Social commentary
In his 2006 book The Myth of Progress, Wessels asserts that the aspiration to sustain indefinite exponential economic growth is an impossibility on the grounds that it violates three scientific principles: the limits to growth, the second law of thermodynamics and the law of self organization. An updated edition was published in 2013, with expanded discussion relating to the global financial crisis of 2008.

Books

Gardner, Blake and Tom Wessels. Untamed Vermont (Thistle Hill Publications, 2003). 
Wessels, Thomas. New England's Roadside Ecology: Explore 30 of the Region's Unique Natural Areas (Timber Press, 2021). 
Wessels, Tom. Reading the Forested Landscape: A Natural History of New England (The Countryman Press, 1997). 
Wessels, Tom. The Granite Landscape: A Natural History of America's Mountain Domes, From Acadia to Yosemite (The Countryman Press, 2001). 
Wessels, Tom. The Myth of Progress: Toward a Sustainable Future (University of Vermont Press, 2006). 
Wessels, Tom. "Forest Forensics: A Field Guide to Reading the Forested Landscape" (The Countryman Press, 2010).

References
Moose Dung Gazette: ESSP Attends Tom Wessels’ Talk
Unity College Keynote Speaker
University Press of New England site for The Myth of Progress
Wessels' Antioch University New England website
Wessels' Bio on Medomak Camp website

External links
Medomak Camp
Rainforest Alliance SmartWood Program
Robert and Patricia Switzer Foundation
Whole Terrain link to Wessels' articles published in Whole Terrain

1951 births
Living people
Antioch University faculty
American environmentalists
American non-fiction environmental writers
University of Colorado alumni
University of New Hampshire alumni
Activists from California